Jan Goessens (born 20 October 1962 in Ghent) is a retired road racing cyclist from Belgium, who was a professional rider from 1986 to 1993, for mainly smaller teams. He was part of Tour de France.

Tour de France record
1987 - 131st overall
1989 - 112th overall
1990 - 114th overall
1991 - retired

References
 

1962 births
Living people
Belgian male cyclists
Sportspeople from Ghent
Cyclists from East Flanders